The All-Japan Shipbuilding and Engineering Union (SEU, Zenzōsen, also known as Zen Nihon Zōsen Kikai Rōdō Kumiai) was a trade union in Japan, representing workers in the ship-building and ship repair industry.

The union was established in September 1946, shortly after the end of World War II. Zenzōsen is a federation of individual, enterprise-level unions - the normal model of trades unionism in Japan.

It was initially the dominant union in the Japanese shipbuilding industry, but was eventually eclipsed by the Japan Confederation of Shipbuilding and Engineering Workers' Unions. Zenzōsen was the more militant of the two unions, and was more strongly represented at the smaller shipyards. Zenzōsen was affiliated to the Japanese Socialist Party.

The union affiliated to the Federation of Independent Unions, and by 1970 it had 53,600 members.  Later, it transferred to the Japanese Trade Union Confederation.  By 1996, its membership was down to 3,226, and in 2016 it dissolved.

References

Shipbuilding trade unions
Trade unions in Japan
Trade unions established in 1946
Trade unions disestablished in 2016